The 2001 FIVB Women's U20 World Championship was held in Santo Domingo, Dominican Republic from September 1 to 9, 2001. 16 teams participated in the tournament.

Qualification process

 * Chinese Taipei replaced Japan.
 ** Croatia qualified as the best second place of the 2001 Women's Junior European Volleyball Championship Qualification's groups.

Pools composition

Preliminary round

Pool A

|}

|}

Pool B

|}

|}

Pool C

|}

|}

Pool D

|}

|}

Second round

Play off – elimination group

|}

Play off – seeding group

|}

Final round

Quarterfinals

|}

5th–8th semifinals

|}

Semifinals

|}

7th place

|}

5th place

|}

3rd place

|}

Final

|}

Final standing

Individual awards

MVP:  Jaqueline Carvalho
Best Scorer:  Han Yoo-Mi
Best Spiker:  Zhang Ping
Best Blocker:  Dragana Marinkovic
Best Server:  Francesca Ferretti
Best Setter:  Zhou Yuenan
Best Receiver:  Liu Li Frang
Best Digger:  Sandra Ferrero
Best Libero:  Ramona Puerari

External links
 Informative website.

World Championship
Women's U20 Volleyball World Championship
FIVB Volleyball Women's U20 World Championship
FIVB Women's Junior World Championship
2001 in youth sport